Poggio Civitate is a hill in the commune of Murlo, Siena, Italy and the location of an ancient settlement of the Etruscan civilization. It was discovered in 1920, and excavations began in 1966 and have uncovered substantial traces of activity in the Orientalizing and Archaic periods as well as some material from both earlier and later periods.

The large Archaic building
Sometime in the early 6th century BCE a "monumental complex" was constructed on Poggio Civitate, a term for large buildings or sets of buildings with uncertain function found in Etruscan architecture. It consisted of a courtyard surrounded by a colonnade on three sides and probably a shrine and a possible throne on the fourth. Surrounding the colonnade and courtyard were four blocks of rooms.

The building was elaborately decorated.  The walls and rooflines contained terracotta statues (including the Murlo cowboy) and friezes.  One of these friezes depicts a banquet scene common to art of archaic Italy.  The scene depicts four servants serving guests reclining on couches as well as hunting dogs.  One guest is playing the lyre while a mixing bowl is situated in the center of two couches.  Others depict mythical, divine, or real humans and animals.  Also depicted are processions, horse races, and warriors marching behind leaders in chariots.  Some scenes depict ceremonies and business being conducted, in one of these a human figurine carries a lituus, a curved staff serving as a symbol of office in Etruria and Latium.

The use of the building is unclear.  One possible use was as the residence of the ruler or leading family of the town.  Fine pottery fragments were discovered, so symposia and banquets likely occurred at the site.

Directors of excavation
 Kyle M. Phillips – Bryn Mawr College (1966-1973)
 Erik Nielsen & Kyle M. Phillips (1973-1981 co-directors)
 Erik Nielsen – President of Franklin University Switzerland (1973-1996)
 Erik Nielsen & Anthony Tuck (1997-2011 co-directors)
 Anthony Tuck – Associate Professor at the University of Massachusetts Amherst (2011–Present)

References

External links
Poggio Civitate excavation project
 

Etruscan sites
Archaeological sites in Tuscany
Etruscan architecture
Murlo